Unity Airport may refer to:

 Unity Aerodrome, a public use airport in Unity, Saskatchewan, Canada (TC: CKE8)
 Unity Airport (Oregon), a private use airport in Unity, Oregon, United States (FAA: 11OG)
 Unity Aerodrome (South Carolina), a private use airport in Lancaster, South Carolina, United States (FAA: SC76)
 Unity Airport (Second Life), a public VR airport.